I'm Not Mata Hari (Spanish: Yo no soy la Mata-Hari) is a 1949 Spanish comedy spy film directed by Benito Perojo and starring Niní Marshall, Roberto Font and Virgilio Teixeira. The film's sets were designed by the art director Sigfrido Burmann. The film's title refers to Mata Hari, the First World War-era spy.

Cast
 Niní Marshall as Niní / agenteX25 / Carmiña / Surabaya  
 Roberto Font as Michel  
 Virgilio Teixeira as Richard / Tte. Jorjof  
 Rafael Calvo as Bonnard - jefe servicios secretos  
 Francisco Pierrá as Durand  
 Ramón Martori as Renoir  
 Rosita Valero as Carmela  
 Trini Montero as Princesa Jesusa  
 Xan das Bolas as Don Cosme Fernández  
 Manuel San Román as Señor X  
 Manuel de Juan as Worsikoff  
 Fernando Aguirre as Basilio  
 Rafael Bardem as Gerente del hotel polaco 
 Julia Caba Alba as Mujer en el tren  
 Pepito Goyanes as Niño espía X110 
 Marisa de Leza as Corista  
 José Durantes 
 Matilde Muñoz Sampedro 
 Manuel Requena 
 Rafael Romero Marchent 
 Tomás Blanco as Richard disfrazado

References

Bibliography
 Bentley, Bernard. A Companion to Spanish Cinema. Boydell & Brewer 2008.

External links 

1949 films
1940s spy comedy films
Spanish spy comedy films
1940s Spanish-language films
Films directed by Benito Perojo
Cultural depictions of Mata Hari
Films scored by Juan Quintero Muñoz
Spanish black-and-white films
1949 comedy films
1940s Spanish films